The SimpliFi Arena at the Stan Sheriff Center is a 10,300-seat multi-purpose arena in Honolulu CDP, City and County of Honolulu, Hawaii, on the campus of the University of Hawaii at Manoa. Initially named the Special Events Arena when it opened in 1994, the arena was renamed in 1998 after Stan Sheriff (1932–1993), a former UH athletic director who lobbied for its construction.

The arena was renamed after Bank of Hawaii secured naming rights to the arena on a 10-year, $5-million contract on November 12, 2020.

Events
Stan Sheriff Center is home to the University of Hawaii men's Rainbow Warriors basketball and Rainbow Warriors volleyball, and the women's Rainbow Wahine basketball, and Rainbow Wahine volleyball teams.

The Diamond Head Classic midseason college basketball tournament is held at the arena annually since December 2009,  and the annual regional FIRST Robotics Competition has been held there since 2010.

On May 12, 1998, the Miss Universe pageant was held at the Center. As Hawaii's largest indoor arena, the Stan Sheriff Center is the site of many major concert tours in Honolulu.  Concert capacity is 11,000 for an end-stage show and 11,300 for a center-stage show. 

World Championship Wrestling used the Stan Sheriff Center as its Hawaiian stop from 1994 until the organization folded in 2001. 

The arena hosted two NBA preseason games between the Los Angeles Lakers and Utah Jazz on October 4 and 6, 2015. Both were designated as Lakers home games; the Jazz swept the short series, winning the second game in overtime. 

The arena again hosted two NBA preseason games between the Los Angeles Clippers and Toronto Raptors on October 1 and 3, 2017. Toronto ended up winning the first game, while the Clippers won the second game. The Clippers returned in 2018 for a preseason game against the Sydney Kings. The Clippers once more hosted 2 more preseason games in 2019 one against the Houston Rockets on October 3, 2019 which Houston won and another against the Shanghai Sharks on October 6, 2019 which the Clippers won.

See also
 List of NCAA Division I basketball arenas

References

External links
 Official page for the Stan Sheriff Center from the UH Athletics web site

Basketball venues in Hawaii
College basketball venues in the United States
College volleyball venues in the United States
Hawaii Rainbow Warriors and Rainbow Wahine basketball
Indoor arenas in Hawaii
Volleyball venues in Hawaii
Buildings and structures in Honolulu
University of Hawaiʻi
Sports venues completed in 1994
Buildings and structures completed in 1994
1994 establishments in Hawaii